Mateusz Szczurek (born 11 August 1975 in Warsaw, Poland) is a Polish economist and politician. He was the Polish Minister of Finance in the governments of successive prime ministers Donald Tusk and Ewa Kopacz from 2013 to 2015.

Education
Szczurek studied at the University of Warsaw and University of Sussex where in 1998 he obtained a master's degree, and in 2005 a PhD. He wrote his Masters thesis on "Chaos and non-linearity in Foreign Exchange Markets."

Career
In 1997 Szczurek was an economist for ING Bank. In 2011 he became the Chief Economist of ING Group for Central Europe and Eastern Europe. He was chief (2003-2005) and co-founder Towarzystwo Absolwentów Uniwersytetów Brytyjskich (Alumni Association of British Universities). He is a member of Association of Polish Economists. On 27 November 2013 the President of Poland appointed him as Minister of Finance. He was named European Finance Minister of the Year in January 2015 by The Banker magazine., and Finance Minister of the Year Central & Eastern Europe 2014 by Emerging Markets magazine.

During his time in office, Szczurek phased out Poland's flexible credit line (FCL) with the International Monetary Fund (IMF). In 2015, he announced that Polish state development bank BGK and its investment vehicle PIR would invest up to 8 billion euros ($8.5 billion) in projects linked to the European Fund for Strategic Investments (EFSI).

Since leaving office, Szczurek has been teaching public finance and international economics at University of Warsaw. He also serves as Associate Director, Lead Regional Economist in the European Bank for Reconstruction and Development (EBRD), monitoring structural reforms and policy dialogue in Central Europe and the Baltics region. In October 2016, he was appointed to the five-member European Fiscal Board, an independent advisory board of the European Commission on fiscal matters.

Personal life
Szczurek has five children.

References

1975 births
Finance Ministers of Poland
Living people
Polish economists
Politicians from Warsaw
University of Warsaw alumni